Lewis Neilson (born 15 May 2003) is a Scottish professional footballer who plays as a defender for Scottish Premiership team Heart of Midlothian. Neilson has previously played for Dundee United and Falkirk.

Club career

Dundee United
Neilson joined Dundee United at the age of 10 and signed his first professional contract with the club in the summer of 2019, before extending the contract until 2022 the following March. After graduating from the club's academy, he made his professional debut in a 1–1 draw against St Johnstone on the opening day of the 2020–21 Scottish Premiership season. Neilson was loaned to Falkirk in March 2021.

Following his return from loan, Neilson sustained an ankle injury, for which he required surgery. He did not appear in the United first team again until December 2021 when he started against Hibernian. Neilson departed United in June 2022 after turning down a new contract offer.

Hearts
After leaving Dundee United, Neilson signed a three-year contract with Hearts.

International career
Neilson has represented Scotland at under-16 and under-17 level.

In September 2022, Neilson was called up to the Scotland under-21 for friendlies against Northern Ireland under-21.

Career statistics

References

External links

Living people
2003 births
Scottish footballers
Association football defenders
Dundee United F.C. players
Scottish Professional Football League players
Scotland youth international footballers
Falkirk F.C. players
Heart of Midlothian F.C. players
Scotland under-21 international footballers